Abracadabrella birdsville is a species of jumping spider in the genus Abracadabrella. The scientific name of this species was first described in 1991 by Zabka. These spiders are usually easily found in Queensland.

References

Salticidae
Fauna of Queensland
Spiders of Australia
Spiders described in 1991